Asare is a surname and first name. Notable people with the surname include:

Abena Oppong-Asare (born 1983), British Labour Party politician
Bediako Asare, Ghanaian journalist and writer
Edward Asare (born 1993), Ghanaian Blogger and a Digital Marketing Professional
Isaac Asare (born 1974), Ghanaian footballer
Jermaine Asare
Jones Kusi-Asare (born 1980), Swedish-Ghanaian footballer
Kwabena Asare (born 1992), Canadian football player
Meshack Asare (born 1945), Ghanaian writer
Patrick Asare
Nana Akwasi Asare (born 1986), Ghanaian footballer
Samuel Asare Konadu (or Asare Konadu) (1932–1994), Ghanaian journalist, writer and publisher
Nsiah Asare
Theodore Obo Asare Jnr (1926), Ghanaian Economist and politician
Yaw Asare

Surnames of Akan origin